Cataldo Spitale (born October 5, 1911 in Rosario) was an Argentine professional football player. He also held Italian citizenship.

He played for 2 seasons in the Serie A for A.S. Roma (23 games, no goals).

References

1911 births
Year of death missing
Argentine footballers
Newell's Old Boys footballers
Boca Juniors footballers
Argentinos Juniors footballers
Club Atlético River Plate footballers
Club Atlético Platense footballers
Serie A players
A.S. Roma players
Club de Gimnasia y Esgrima La Plata footballers
Association football defenders
Footballers from Rosario, Santa Fe